Peter Matthew Putnam (born August 6, 1976 in Dalton, Georgia), is an American IFBB professional bodybuilder, fitness spokesmodel, and celebrity trainer. He is the 2004 NPC Collegiate Nationals Champion, the 2007 NPC USAs Light-heavyweight Champion, and the 2008 NPC Nationals Light-heavyweight Champion. Putnam has appeared in many worldwide bodybuilding publications and been featured on covers such as Muscle and Fitness and FLEX. He has also appeared as a MADE Coach on MTV and a cover model on Jeff Foxworthy's 2000 album, Big Funny. 

In addition to his professional tenure as a bodybuilder, Peter is a professional recording artist. His single "We Didn't Want Your War" is an anthem of defiance against the injustice happening in Ukraine. The song was written to raise support for the Ukrainian people. Peter also has released a full length album entitled, "The Shadowlands". Both releases were recorded at the legendary American Recording Studio in Memphis, Tennessee where Elvis Presley recorded his most famous studio album, "From Elvis in Memphis". "Black Raven" a track off Peter's "The Shadowlands" is a tribute to Loretta Lynn that was recorded the day after the country music star passed away.

References

1976 births
Living people
People from Dalton, Georgia
University of Alabama alumni
American bodybuilders